Atlanta–Fulton County Stadium, often referred to as Fulton County Stadium and originally named Atlanta Stadium, was a multi-purpose stadium in the southeastern United States, located in Atlanta. The stadium was home of the Atlanta Braves of the Major League Baseball and the Atlanta Falcons of the National Football League. It was built to attract an MLB team and in 1966 succeeded when the Milwaukee Braves relocated from Wisconsin.

The Braves and expansion Falcons shared the venue for 26 years, until the Falcons moved into the newly completed Georgia Dome in 1992. The Braves continued to play at the stadium for another five years, then moved into Turner Field in 1997, the converted Centennial Olympic Stadium built for the previous year's Summer Olympics, which hosted baseball events. Atlanta–Fulton County Stadium was demolished on August 2, 1997.

History

During his 1961 campaign for mayor of Atlanta, Ivan Allen Jr. promised to build a sports facility to attract a Major League Baseball team. After winning office, Allen chose a  plot in the Washington–Rawson neighborhood for the building site, citing its proximity to the state capitol, downtown businesses, and major highways. Allen and The Atlanta Journal sports editor Furman Bisher attempted to persuade Charlie Finley, owner of the Kansas City Athletics, to move his team to Atlanta. Finley was receptive and began discussing stadium design plans with Allen. However, the deal ended in July 1963 when the American League did not approve the move.

In 1964, Mayor Allen announced that an unidentified team had given him a verbal commitment to move to Atlanta, provided a stadium was in place by 1966. Soon afterward, the prospective team was revealed to be the Milwaukee Braves, who announced in October that they intended to move to Atlanta for the 1965 season. However, court battles kept the Braves in Milwaukee for one last season.

The new stadium was built on the site of the cleared Washington–Rawson neighborhood, which a half-century before had been a wealthy neighborhood home to Georgia's governor, among others, but which by the 1960s had fallen on hard times. Forty-seven dignitaries took part in a groundbreaking ceremony on April 15, 1964, and that November, the Braves signed a 25-year agreement to play there, beginning in 1966. Construction was completed on April 9, 1965, for $18 million, and that night the Milwaukee Braves and Detroit Tigers played an exhibition game in the stadium. During that year the International League's Atlanta Crackers, whose previous home had been Ponce de Leon Park, played their final season in Atlanta Stadium.

In 1966, both the National League's transplanted Braves and the National Football League's Atlanta Falcons, an expansion team, began to use the facilities. In 1967, the Atlanta Chiefs of the National Professional Soccer League (re-formed as the North American Soccer League in 1968) began the first of five seasons played at the stadium. The venue hosted the second match of the NASL Final 1968 and two matches of the NASL Final 1971.

On February 11, 1975, the stadium's name was changed to the compound Atlanta–Fulton County Stadium after the county threatened to withdraw its financial support.  However, the official website of the Atlanta Braves maintains that the name change occurred after Ted Turner purchased the team in 1976.

The Falcons moved to the Georgia Dome in 1992, while the Braves remained until Centennial Olympic Stadium from the 1996 Summer Olympics was converted into Turner Field, which was completed just prior to the start of the 1997 season. The stadium sat 60,606 for football and 52,007 for baseball. The baseball competition for the 1996 Summer Olympics was held at Atlanta–Fulton County Stadium while the Braves were on a three-week road trip.

Demolition

Following the Olympics and the 1996 World Series, Fulton County commissioner, Marvin S. Arrington Sr., wanted to preserve the stadium as the home of a future Major League Soccer franchise and share the parking facilities between it and Turner Field but he was unable to push it through.

Between late 1996 and summer 1997, the inside of the stadium was demolished. The stadium was imploded on August 2, 1997; the remains were later removed and demolished. A parking lot, built for Turner Field now stands on the site, with an outline of the old stadium built in. The monument that marked the landing point of Hank Aaron's historic 715th home run stands in the same place it did when the stadium was on the site.

Redevelopment
Upon the Atlanta Braves' move to Truist Park in suburban Cobb County after the 2016 season, the stadium site and the adjacent Turner Field were purchased by Georgia State University in 2016, with final approval from the Board of Regents of the University System of Georgia on November 9 of that year. Turner Field was renovated into Center Parc Stadium for the Panthers football team, while new baseball and softball parks are planned for the former Atlanta–Fulton County Stadium site.

Notable events

Baseball
 On April 12, 1966, Joe Torre hit the first major league home run in the history of Atlanta Stadium.
 On July 25, 1972, the stadium hosted the Major League Baseball All-Star Game. Hank Aaron hit a home run during the game, and the National League won it, 4–3, in 10 innings.
 On April 8, 1974, Hank Aaron became baseball's all-time career home run leader by hitting his 715th home run off the Los Angeles Dodgers' Al Downing.
 During a series between the Braves and the San Diego Padres, one game spawned several brawls between the two teams. On August 12, 1984, Braves pitcher Pascual Pérez hit the Padres' Alan Wiggins with a pitch; Wiggins did not charge the mound, but the Padres vowed revenge on Pérez for his actions (several Padres were ejected in their subsequent attempts to hit Pérez). When Pérez was finally hit, by a pitch thrown by the Padres' Craig Lefferts, the first of many bench-clearing brawls began. By the time the game was over, both teams' lineups had been nearly emptied (due to all the ejections on both sides).
 The stadium hosted the World Series for the first time in 1991 when the Braves played the Minnesota Twins in what ESPN judged to be the best World Series ever played. The Braves won all three games played in Atlanta, two in their final at-bat, but lost the series in seven games.
 The 1992 World Series saw the Braves play the Toronto Blue Jays with the Blue Jays defeating the Braves four games to two, including two of three in Atlanta.
 On July 20, 1993, a fire occurred in the stadium press box during batting practice for that evening's game against the St. Louis Cardinals. This fire occurred on the same day Fred McGriff joined the Braves.
 On October 10, 1995, the Braves clinched the 1995 NLDS the 1st team to win a Division Series since the NLDS format in the playoff system began that same year. They defeated the Colorado Rockies 3 games to 1, with the decisive win at home.
 On October 28, 1995, the Braves clinched the 1995 World Series by defeating the Cleveland Indians, 1–0, on a one-hit, 8-inning performance by pitcher Tom Glavine. The title was the Braves' first World Series championship in Atlanta, making one title in each of the three cities in which they have resided (also Boston and Milwaukee).
 September 23, 1996, marked the stadium's final regular season game as the Braves played host to the Montreal Expos.  Atlanta won the game 3–1 and clinched the NL Eastern Division title in the process.
 The stadium's final event was Game 5 of the 1996 World Series, when the Braves played host to the New York Yankees. The final score was 1–0 in favor of the Yankees, with the ballpark's final run scored by Charlie Hayes. The final ceremonial first pitch was thrown to Eddie Perez by former President Jimmy Carter, who had done the honors at Braves home openers while still Governor of Georgia. The winning pitcher was New York's Andy Pettitte, defeating the Braves' John Smoltz. The final hit was recorded by Atlanta's Chipper Jones, who doubled off Pettitte in the bottom of the ninth inning. Pinch-hitter Luis Polonia was the final out in Fulton County Stadium's history, hitting a deep fly ball to right-center field caught by Yankees right fielder Paul O'Neill, which gave the stadium's final save to John Wetteland. (Since no home runs were hit in that game the final home run in the stadium's history belongs to Jim Leyritz, who hit a 3-run home run in Game 4. Leyritz was also Pettitte's batterymate for Game 5.)

Football
 The Pittsburgh Steelers and Minnesota Vikings played the first NFL preseason game on August 14, .
 On September 11, 1966, the Atlanta Falcons played their first game in the stadium and lost to the Los Angeles Rams 19–14.
 The Falcons' last game played at the stadium was on December 15, 1991, where they defeated the Seattle Seahawks 26–13, clinching a NFC wild-card spot for the team's first playoff berth since 1982; among some of the attendees included Wayne Newton and MC Hammer.

Concerts

Other events
 In February 1966 Vietnam War supporters held a prayer rally that featured Dean Rusk as its keynote speaker.
 The stadium hosted a round of the AMA Supercross Championship 1977–1986 and 1989–1992.
 In 1994, the UniverSoul Circus conducted its first performance at the stadium.

Layout
The stadium was relatively nondescript, one of the many multi-purpose stadiums built during the 1960s and 1970s, similar to Veterans Stadium, RFK Stadium, the Astrodome, Three Rivers Stadium, Busch Memorial Stadium, Oakland–Alameda County Coliseum and Riverfront Stadium.

As was the case for every stadium that used this design concept, the fundamentally different sizes and shapes of baseball and football fields made it inadequate for both sports. In the baseball configuration, 70% of the seats were in foul territory. One unusual feature of this stadium is the fact that, unlike most multi-purpose stadiums – where the football field was laid either parallel to one of the foul lines or running from home plate to center field – the football field here was laid along a line running between first and third base. Oakland–Alameda County Coliseum has a similar configuration. Thus, a seat behind home plate for baseball would also be on the 50-yard line for football. The stadium was refurbished for the 1996 season prior to hosting the Olympic baseball competition.

Unlike similarly designed outdoor stadiums—such as Riverfront Stadium and Busch Memorial Stadium—Fulton County Stadium always had a natural grass surface. However, for many years it was notorious for its poor field conditions. Until 1989, it didn't have full-time groundskeepers. Instead, it was tended to by a municipal street-maintenance crew.

It retained this distinction for 27 seasons, until the expansion Colorado Rockies entered the National League in 1993. The high elevation and the Southern summer heat made it favorable to home run hitters, resulting in the nickname "The Launching Pad." Until the Florida Marlins arrived (also in 1993), the stadium was the hottest in the majors.

Fulton County Stadium was designed by a joint-venture team of FABRAP (Finch Alexander Barnes Rothschild & Paschal) and Heery, Inc.

Seating capacity

References

External links

 Two vintage postcards showing the stadium from the air. Both cards were published around 1965 or 1966
 TerraServer photo of old stadium outline in parking lot, and Turner Field

1965 establishments in Georgia (U.S. state)
Venues of the 1996 Summer Olympics
Sports venues demolished in 1997
Demolished sports venues in Georgia (U.S. state)
American football venues in Atlanta
Atlanta Braves stadiums
Atlanta Falcons stadiums
a
Buildings and structures demolished by controlled implosion
Defunct American football venues in the United States
Defunct baseball venues in the United States
Defunct multi-purpose stadiums in the United States
Defunct Major League Baseball venues
Defunct National Football League venues
Defunct soccer venues in the United States
Defunct NCAA bowl game venues
Demolished buildings and structures in Atlanta
American football venues in Georgia (U.S. state)
Baseball venues in Georgia (U.S. state)
Multi-purpose stadiums in the United States
Olympic baseball venues
Cecil Alexander buildings
North American Soccer League (1968–1984) stadiums
1997 disestablishments in Georgia (U.S. state)
Sports venues completed in 1965
Soccer venues in Georgia (U.S. state)